The 2003 Paddy Power World Grand Prix was the sixth staging of the World Grand Prix darts tournament, organised by the Professional Darts Corporation. It was held at the Citywest Hotel in Dublin, Ireland, between 20–26 October 2003.

For the second consecutive year, the final was contested between Phil Taylor and John Part. Taylor won 7–2 (which included a crucial run of twelve consecutive legs) to secure his fifth Grand Prix title.

Prize money

Seeds

Draw

References

World Grand Prix (darts)
World Grand Prix Darts
World Grand Prix Darts